"Nimbooda" (English: "Lime") is a traditional folk tune from Rajasthan. It was first popularized by Gazi Khan Barna of the Manganiar community in Rajasthan.

The song discusses fetching limes from the fields as a double entendre.

Commercial versions

"Nimbooda" was adapted for the 1999 Hindi film Hum Dil De Chuke Sanam. The music was adapted by Ismail Darbar and the lyrics were revised by Mehboob. "Nimbooda" was sung by Kavita Krishnamurthy and Karsan Sagathia and picturised on Aishwarya Rai Bachchan, Ajay Devgn and Salman Khan.

Music video

Within the film, the song is performed as a dance at a wedding in Rajasthan. After fighting with her love interest Sameer (Salman Khan), Nandini (Aishwarya Rai) draws the attention of Vanraj (Ajay Devgan) who is a guest at the wedding. Saroj Khan choreographed the dancers.

Other versions
Alia Bhatt recreated the film version during a performance for the 2017 Filmfare Awards. Wearing a blue gagra choli, she performed the film's original dance steps for a television audience.

In 2017, Konnie Metaxa, a contestant on the Greek reality show Your Face Sounds Familiar, sang and danced to "Nimbooda" and won the 10th round with her performance.
 
The song was parodied by The Late Show with Stephen Colbert in February 2018. In the video, they digitally replaced Ajay Devgan's head with Donald Trump Jr. to satirise Trump's comments about poor people in India.

Awards
2000 Filmfare Award for Best Choreography for Saroj Khan 
 2000 Zee Cine Award for Best Female Playback Singer for Kavita Krishnamurthy

References

Kavita Krishnamurthy songs
1999 songs
Songs with music by Ismail Darbar
Indian folk songs
Hindi film songs